The 1982–83 Rutgers Scarlet Knights men's basketball represented Rutgers University as a member of the Atlantic-10 Conference during the 1982–83 NCAA Division I men's basketball season. The head coach was Tom Young and the team played its home games in Louis Brown Athletic Center in Piscataway Township, New Jersey. The Scarlet Knights finished first in the conference's East division, but lost in the semifinals of the Atlantic-10 tournament. The Scarlet Knights received an at-large bid to the NCAA tournament. After an opening round win over Southwestern Louisiana, Rutgers fell to St. John's, 66–55, in the round of 32. Rutgers finished with a 23–8 record (11–3 A-10).

Roster

Schedule and results

|-
!colspan=9 style=| Regular season

|-
!colspan=9 style=| Atlantic-10 tournament

|-
!colspan=9 style=| NCAA tournament

Awards and honors
Roy Hinson – Atlantic 10 co-Player of the Year

NBA Draft

References 

Rutgers
Rutgers Scarlet Knights men's basketball seasons
Rutgers
1982 in sports in New Jersey
1983 in sports in New Jersey